In several Akan nations of Ghana, the Omanhene (Pl. Amanhene) is the title of the supreme traditional ruler ('king') in a region or a larger town. The omanhene is the central figure and institution of the nation. Officially, he has no function in the current Ghanaian political setup, but, has enormous influence on the people that constitute it. Today 'Hene' can be found in titles of other rulers in Ghanaian nations. For example, the chief of the Dagomba in the north of Ghana is known as the 'Dagombahene'.

The Akan omanhene and collectively the Ahemfo are major land owners, and are the heads of an essentially feudal system. They commit the land they theoretically hold in trust to caretakers.

Amanhene are appointed by Ahemma (queen mothers) that are often but not necessarily their birth mothers, but are always a direct matrilineal relative. Dynastic succession tends to follow a matrilineal pattern. The exception to this is found, though, in a few Akan states such as Elmina.

Not all Akan nations have the Omanhene as the supreme ruler. The Ashanti, for example, have as the supreme ruler the person of the Asantehene ( or 'Emperor'), who is superior to the Amanhenes of Asanteman.

Ahafo Region

 Acherensua
 Goaso
 Kukuom
 Akrodie
 Bechem
 Duayaw-Nkwanta
 Hwidiem
 Kenyasi No. 1
 Kenyasi No. 2
 Sankore
 Mim
 Yamfo
 Ntotroso

Ashanti Region

 Otumfuo, the Asantehene - Otumfuo Nana Osei Tutu II
 Mampong
 Essumeja
 Adansi
 Juaben - Nana Otuo Siriboe II
 Nsuta
 Kumawu
 Kokofu
 Bekwai
 Offinso
 Agona
 Ejisu
 Denyasi
 Asokore
 Agogo - Nana Akuoko Sarpong
 Obogu
 Manso-Nkwanta
 Tepa

Bono Region

 Banda
 Badu
 Berekum
 Drobo
 Dwenem
 Dormaa - Osagyefo Oseadeeyo Agyeman Badu II
 Japekrom
 Kwatwoma
 Sampa
 Sunyani
 Nsawkaw
 Nsoatre
 Odomase No.1
 Awua Dornase
 Suma
 Seikwa
 Wenchi

Bono East Region

 Nkoranza
 Prang
 Abease
 Adjaade
 Akroso
 Amantin
 Atebubu
 Dwan
 Techiman
 Mo
 Nkomi
 Wiase
 Offuman
 Tanoboase
 Tanoso
 Tuobodom

Central Region

 Ekumfi
 Enyan-Abaasa
 Ajumako
 Asikuma
 Esiam
 Enyan-Maim
 Mankessim
 Abeadzi
 Kwamankese
 Abura
 Nkusukum
 Anomabo
 Denkyira
 Awutu
 Assin Apimannim
 Agona Nyakrom
 Edina
 Effutu
 Gomoa Ajumako
 Gomoa Akyempim
 Hemang
 Oguaa
 Assin-Attadasu
 Twifu
 Komenda
 Eguafo
 Agona Nsaba
 Enyan Denkyira
 Abirem
 Asebu
 Atti Mokwaa
 Effutuakwa
 Senya
 Assin Owirenkyi
 Sanaahene of Oguaa - Nana Kofi Obiri Egyir II

Eastern Region

 Akyem Abuakwa
 Akyem Bosome
 Akyem Kotoku
 Akwapim 
 Akuapem - Oseadeoyo Kwasi Akuffo III
 Akwamu - Odeneho Kwafo Akotto III
 Kwahu
 New Juaben
 Yilo Krobo
 Manya Krobo
 Boso-Gua
 Anum

Greater Accra Region

 Ga
 Osudoku
 Shai
 Ningo
 Prampram
 Kpone
 Ada
 La
 Ngleshie Alata
 Nungua
 Osu
 Tema
 Teshie

Western Region

Western North Region

 Sefwi-Anwiaso - Ogyeahohoo Yaw Gyebi II
 Sefwi-Bekwai - Odeneho Gyapong Ababio
 Sefwi-Wiawso - Katakyie Kwesi Bumagamah II
 Sefwi-Chirano - Okogyeaman Kwaku Gyambra III
 Aowin - Beyeman Brentum III
 Suaman - Odeneho Bentum IV

References

Ghanaian royalty
Society of Ghana
Ghanaian leaders